The Spirit class is a class of cruise ships built at the Kvaerner Masa-Yards Helsinki New Shipyard in Helsinki, Finland. The ships are operated by Carnival Cruise Lines, CSSC Carnival Cruise Shipping and Costa Cruises (a subsidiary of Miami-based Carnival Corporation). The six ships were built to the original Panamax form factor, allowing them to pass through the Panama Canal. This class has the smallest of the signature smoke stacks that Carnival has on their ships. Carnival's Spirit-class ships also feature a unique funnel design that integrates the skylight dome of the atrium.

As of November 2022, Costa Luminosa (now Carnival Luminosa) is marketed by Carnival as a part of their Spirit class.

Ships

See also
  – a similar Panamax ship operated by P&O Cruises.
  and  – A similar set of Panamax ships operated by Princess Cruises
 s – a similar class of Panamax ships operated by Royal Caribbean International
 Signature-class cruise ship – a similar class of Panamax ships operated by Holland America Line

References

External links

 Carnival Cruise Lines

Cruise ship classes
Panamax cruise ships
Ships built in Finland
Carnival Cruise Lines
Costa Cruises
Luminosa